Sanna Tities is a South African politician who has been serving as a Member of the Northern Cape Provincial Legislature since 22 May 2019. A member of the African National Congress (ANC), she is the Chairperson of both the Portfolio Committee on Health and Social Development and the Standing Committee on Gender, Women, Children and Persons with Disabilities.

References

External links
Sanna Tities – People's Assembly
Profile : Ms Sanna Tities – NCPLEG

Living people
African National Congress politicians
Members of the Northern Cape Provincial Legislature
People from the Northern Cape
Women members of provincial legislatures of South Africa
21st-century South African politicians
Year of birth missing (living people)
21st-century South African women politicians